Toledo Christian Schools is a non-denominational, co-educational Christian school in Toledo, Ohio.

Mission 
Toledo Christian Schools working with Christian families, provides a college-preparatory Bible-centered educational program to educate, disciple, and prepare students to follow Christ and impact culture.

Academics 
Classical Christian Education

Notable alumni 
Matt Hammitt, Christian singer, songwriter and author

References 

Christian schools in Ohio
Education in Toledo, Ohio
Private schools in Ohio